Without Her is a Canadian thriller film, directed by Jean Beaudin and released in 2006. The film stars Karine Vanasse as Camille, a woman returning home to Quebec for the first time since leaving for Italy after the disappearance of her mother.

The film's cast also includes Marie-Thérèse Fortin, Maxim Gaudette, Linda Sorgini, Isabel Richer, Patrick Goyette, Emmanuel Schwartz and Johanne-Marie Tremblay.

Composer Jean Robitaille won the Genie Award for Best Original Score at the 27th Genie Awards for his work on the film.

References

External links
 

2006 films
Canadian thriller films
Films directed by Jean Beaudin
2006 thriller films
French-language Canadian films
2000s Canadian films